The 2016 European Rowing Championships were held in Brandenburg, Germany, between 6 and 8 May 2016.

Medal summary

Men

Women

Medal table

References

External links

 Official website

European Rowing Championships
2016
2016 European Rowing Championships
European Rowing Championships
Sport in Brandenburg
Rowing competitions in Germany